The Revolutionary Labour Bloc (Spanish: Bloque Laborista Revolucionario) was a grouping in the Senate of Córdoba in Argentina. It was formed after the 1946 election, by four dissident senators from the Peronist bloc; Federico de Uña (chairman of the Unión Obrera del Dulce y Anexos), Carlos Rossini, Godofredo Stauffer (land-owner from Unión Cívica Radical) and Antonio Llorens (who had belonged to UCR). The Revolutionary Labour Bloc emerged as a prominent force in the provincial legislature and spearheaded an impeachment trial against the incumbent state governor. These events led Juan Perón to dissolve the provincial legislature in 1947.

References

Political parties in Argentina